Goobey is a surname. Notable people with the surname include:

Alastair Ross Goobey (1945–2008), British investment manager and pension fund manager
George Ross Goobey (1911–1999), British fund manager, father of Alastair

See also
 Gooby